The Scenic Highway is a coastal highway from Yeppoon to Emu Park, both on the Capricorn Coast in the Shire of Livingstone, Queensland, Australia.

Route 
The highway commences at a roundabout near the southern boundary of Yeppoon, which connects to the (northern) main road from Rockhampton (Yeppoon Road) and the coastal road to the northern part of Yeppoon (Appleton Drive) It passes from Yeppoon through Cooee Bay, Lammermoor, Rosslyn, Mulambin, Causeway Lake and Kinka Beach to Emu Park.

After proceeding south-east for about 350 metres it crosses Ross Creek and passes between Cooee Bay (to the east) and Taranganba (to the west) It then proceeds through Lammermoor, running beside the beach for about 1 km before reaching Rosslyn. Where it enters Rosslyn the road is cut into an ocean-front cliff-face near Statue Bay. This section of road was closed from 20 February 2015 until 26 July 2018 due to a landslip caused by Cyclone Marcia. A temporary detour through suburban streets was in use throughout the closure.

The road continues south along the coast, crossing Mulambin Creek at Causeway Lake and running the length of Kinka Beach. It then proceeds slightly inland to cross Shoalwater Creek and enter the locality of Emu Park. In Emu Park it terminates at a roundabout which connects to the (southern) main road to Rockhampton (Hill Street, which becomes Emu Park Road), the Emu Park Jetty (to the north-east) and the southern part of Emu Park.

Major intersections
The entire road is in the Shire of Livingstone local government area.

References

Highways in Queensland